Marchesa is an American brand specializing in women's wear based in New York City. It was established in 2004 by Georgina Chapman and Keren Craig. Marchesa is known for designing dresses for several celebrities, including Scarlett Johansson, Jennifer Lopez, Cate Blanchett, Anne Hathaway, and Penélope Cruz.

Products 

Marchesa launched a handbag line, wedding dress line, Marchesa Bridal Couture, and collaborated with Lenox on dinnerware designs.

In 2010, Marchesa collaborated with Le Métier de Beauty on a cosmetics line featuring the palettes of designers Chapman and Craig.

History
Marchesa is named after socialite Marchesa Luisa Casati. Founders Georgina Chapman and Keren Craig met at Chelsea College of Art and Design in London. Chapman, a graduate of the Wimbledon School of Art, began her career as a costume designer. Craig graduated from Brighton Art College focused on print and embroidery design. Chapman's draping and design paired with Craig's textile creations resulted in the establishment of Marchesa in 2004. Sienna Miller wore Marchesa on the cover of Vogue magazine's September 2007 issue (photographed by Mario Testino), which was the subject of the 2009 documentary, The September Issue.

Celebrities
The brand has been worn by many Hollywood actresses on the red carpet. Sandra Bullock wore Marchesa at the 2010 Academy Awards, where she won Best Actress and was also named among the best dressed by readers of the Huffington Post. Sarah Hyland wore Marchesa at the 2013 MTV Video Music Awards. Several celebrities wore Marchesa to the 2016 Met Gala, including Poppy Delevingne, Karolína Kurková, and Nina Dobrev.

Weinstein controversy
The success of the brand among celebrities was in part attributed to the influence of Miramax producer Harvey Weinstein, Chapman's then-husband. Weinstein reportedly pressured actresses who appeared in his films to wear the brand. After sexual abuse accusations against Weinstein emerged with allegations made by multiple actresses, Marchesa, once a mainstay of the red carpet, was shunned by celebrities attending various awards ceremonies in favor of other brands. In May 2018, Scarlett Johansson broke this months-long trend of red-carpet Marchesa avoidance by wearing a custom-made gown from the brand to the Met Gala.

After the Weinstein scandal broke, the Fall 2019 collection was presented by couture design director Anna Holvik and Notte design director Ceazar Cabreros instead of Chapman and Craig.

On June 25, 2019, Craig announced her intention to leave Marchesa and was later replaced by Artur Sjakowska.

References

External links
 

2004 establishments in New York City
Clothing brands of the United States
Clothing companies based in New York City
Clothing companies established in 2004
Fashion accessory brands
High fashion brands
Privately held companies based in New York (state)